Julian Riley, known professionally as Elektra Fence, is an English drag queen who is best known for being a contestant on the third series of RuPaul's Drag Race UK in 2021.

Biography
Julian Riley was born in Burnley, Lancashire, to parents with cerebral palsy. She has three brothers, one of whom died when Riley was a teenager. She later began performing in drag under the stage name Elektra Fence, a name she chose after a video of her touching an electric fence went viral on social media. In 2021, Fence was announced as one of the contestants competing in the third series of RuPaul's Drag Race UK. Following the first episode, she found herself in the bottom two against Anubis Finch and won the lip sync to "Sweet Melody" by Little Mix. The following week, she found herself in the bottom two again, this time against Vanity Milan and was eliminated after lip syncing to "Moving on Up by M People.

In 2022, Fence was subject to a homophobic assault on a train. Later that year, she embarked on the RuPaul's Drag Race UK: The Official Tour alongside the cast of the third series.

Filmography

Television

Stage

References 

1992 births
Living people
20th-century LGBT people
21st-century LGBT people
English drag queens
Gay entertainers
People from Burnley
People from Lancashire
RuPaul's Drag Race UK contestants